Jongjasan may refer to:
 Jongjasan (Gyeonggi), Yeoncheon, and Pocheon, Gyeonggi-do
 Jongjasan (Gangwon), Hongcheon, Gangwon-do, South Korea